Revolution is an album by the Christian rock band YFriday.  Released in 2003, Revolution is the band's third studio album.

Track listing
 Rise – 3:19
 Someone I Can Live For – 2:34
 Revolution – 3:22
 Hands Up – 4:10
 13 – 3:48
 Saved the Day – 3:01
 Lift – 4:03
 Start of the Summer – 3:33
 Shine2 – 3:32
 Lament – 4:07

All music and lyrics by Ken Riley.

Personnel
Ken Riley - vocals and guitars
Gav Richards - keyboards and backing vocals
Danny Smith - bass
Dez Minto - drums
Michelle John - backing vocals
Tracey Riggan - backing vocals
Carla Hayes - backing vocals

Reception

The album was reviewed in issue 77 of the Cross Rhythms Magazine; the review was favourable, describing the album as "simply excellent" and its sound as "an organic, stripped down rock sound".

References

2003 albums
Survivor Records albums
YFriday albums